Buket Bengisu (born 19 September 1978) is a Turkish singer. She finished her primary studies in Istanbul. She grew up in a family that was closely associated with music, as her father was a bassist and her mother was a pianist. In 1996, she enrolled in the Istanbul University State Conservatory, studying chorus singing. In 2000, she went to the same school again and in 2003 graduated with a degree in musical singing. She also played for five years at the Turkey Children Theater and took part in a number of plays.

In 2002, together with Grup Safir she took part in a competition for representing Turkey in the Eurovision Song Contest 2002 and performed the song "Leylaklar Soldu Kalbinde", earning the permission to take part in the Eurovision Song Contest 2002. The other members were Eser Alioğlu, Dilek Aba, Gülnur Gökçe and Sitare Bilge. At the contest, they earned 29 points and ended up in the 16th place.

In 2011, Bengisu won the Special prize of jury WAFA Awards at the "Golden Voice Moldova" Festival, followed by Award of Most Promising Performer and Award for best lyrics at the "XX.International Discovery Pop Music", and the Best Song award at the Award of Bulgarian National Radio. Bengisu also organized a "Eurovision From Past to Present" concert in 2011.

References

Turkish musical groups
Eurovision Song Contest entrants of 2002
Eurovision Song Contest entrants for Turkey
1978 births
Living people
Musical groups from Istanbul